Sabah Mohamed Ibrahim (born 18 April 1980) is a Maldivian footballer who plays for New Radiant as a defender. He represented Maldives at international from 2001 to 2011.

Career
Sabah has played club football for Club Eagles, Club Valencia and New Radiant. He then joined Victory SC and left the club in the middle of the 2011 season. After the 2011 season, he joined VB Addu FC for a one-year contract. Before the contract ends, VB Addu FC released him in the mid-season and Sobah joined Club Eagles.

He made his international debut in 2001.

Honours

Maldives
 SAFF Championship: 2008

References

External links
 

1980 births
Living people
Maldivian footballers
Maldives international footballers
Club Valencia players
New Radiant S.C. players
Victory Sports Club players
Footballers at the 2002 Asian Games
Association football defenders
Asian Games competitors for the Maldives
Club Eagles players